József Antal Eszterhás (commonly known in America as Joe Eszterhas born November 23, 1944) is a Hungarian-American writer. He attended Ohio University. He wrote the screenplays for the films Flashdance, Jagged Edge, Basic Instinct and Showgirls. His books include American Rhapsody, Crossbearer: A Memoir of Faith and an autobiography titled Hollywood Animal.

Early life
Eszterhás was born in Csákánydoroszló, a village in Hungary to Roman Catholic parents, Mária (née Bíró) and István Eszterhás. Eszterhás was born during World War II, and lived as a child in a refugee camp in Allied-occupied Austria. The family eventually moved to New York City, and then to immigrant neighborhoods in Cleveland, where Eszterhas spent most of his childhood. 

Eszterhas learned, at age 45, that his father had concealed his World War II collaboration in Hungary’s Arrow Cross Party government after the German occupation of Hungary and that he had "organized book burnings and had produced anti-Semitic propaganda." Eszterhas later described his father’s anti-Semitic pamphlets as “like the Hungarian version of Mein Kampf.” After this discovery, he cut his father out of his life entirely, never reconciling before his father's death in 2001.

Journalist and book author
Eszterhas was a senior editor for Rolling Stone from 1971 to 1975. 

He became a National Book Award nominee for his nonfiction work Charlie Simpson's Apocalypse in 1974. 

Eszterhas was the subject of a lawsuit for his reporting for The Plain Dealer. Cantrell v. Forest City Publishing (1974) is one of only two false light cases heard by the U.S. Supreme Court. As a reporter for The Plain Dealer, Eszterhas had covered the aftermath of the collapse of a bridge across the Ohio River. The article included a supposed interview of the widow of one of the fatal victims of the collapse. Months after the accident, he and a photographer visited the home of Margaret Cantrell. She was not home, but he talked to the children as the photographer took photos. His Sunday magazine feature focused on the family's poverty and contained several inaccuracies. Eszterhas had made it seem as though he had spoken to her, describing her mood and attitude in the story. Cantrell filed suit for invasion of privacy, and won a $60,000 judgment in her favor. The decision was overturned in the Court of Appeals on First Amendment grounds, but in the end, the U.S. Supreme Court upheld the original judgment in her favor.

Screenwriter
Eszterhas' first produced screenplay was F.I.S.T., directed by Norman Jewison. Eszterhas contributed to the script of 1983's Flashdance, and wrote the screenplays for Jagged Edge and Betrayed. 

In 1989, Eszterhas planned to leave Creative Artists Agency because an old friend was restarting his agency. Michael Ovitz, then the chairman of CAA, threatened to prevent CAA actors from acting in Eszterhas' future projects. Eszterhas penned a letter to Ovitz blasting him for his tactics. Copies of the letter were circulated around Hollywood and the missive was credited with loosening the stranglehold of power that CAA had on the entertainment industry.

A spec script Eszterhas wrote originally titled Love Hurts became the subject of a bidding war amongst various production companies in Hollywood, eventually selling for a then-record $3 million in 1990. The project eventually materialized into Basic Instinct, directed by Dutch filmmaker Paul Verhoeven. Released in 1992 to more than $400 million at the box office, Basic Instinct and its success led to Eszterhas becoming one of the most sought-after screenwriters at the time.  

The following year, Eszterhas re-teamed with Basic Instinct star Sharon Stone for the film Sliver. Sliver did not replicate the box-office success of the former and was critically derided. Eszterhas next wrote the screenplay for Showgirls, his second collaboration with director Verhoeven. Showgirls, which debuted in 1995, was seen as a critical and financial disaster, winning the year's Golden Raspberry Award for "Worst Screenplay". Despite the negative press, the film enjoyed cult success in the home video market, generating more than $100 million from video rentals and becoming one of MGM's top twenty all-time bestsellers. Jade, whose script Eszterhas sold in the wake of Basic Instinct's success, was released three weeks later to low grosses and negative reviews. The one-two punch of back-to-back box-office bombs in the same year saw Eszterhas' reputation as the highest-paid screenwriter take a hit.

In 1997, Eszterhas produced two films, both of which he wrote: Telling Lies in America and An Alan Smithee Film: Burn Hollywood Burn. Burn Hollywood Burn, which is about a director named Alan Smithee who films a big-budget bomb and then tries to destroy it, flopped at the box office. It won several Golden Raspberry Awards, four of them awarded to Eszterhas himself: Worst Picture (Eszterhas was the film's uncredited producer), Worst Screenplay, and both Worst New Star and Worst Supporting Actor for a brief on-screen cameo.

The failure of Burn Hollywood Burn further affected Eszterhas' career: none of the screenplays he wrote between 1997 and 2006 were produced. However, Children of Glory, a Hungarian language film based upon his screenplay, was released in 2006. The film focuses upon both the 1956 Hungarian Revolution and the Blood in the Water match at the 1956 Melbourne Olympics. Children of Glory was entered by invitation in the official section of the 2007 Berlin Film Festival.

Feud with Mel Gibson
In 2011, it was announced actor-director Mel Gibson had commissioned Eszterhas to write a screenplay: a historical biopic on Judah and The Maccabees, titled M.C.K.B.I. The film was to be distributed by Warner Bros. The announcement generated controversy. In a 2008 interview, Eszterhas wrote that "Mel shared the mind-set of Adolf Hitler."

In a February 2012 interview with Andrew Goldman of The New York Times, Goldman said to Eszterhas: "[Gibson's] film The Passion of the Christ was widely considered anti-Semitic. Then, during a 2006 arrest for drunken driving, he ranted that 'the Jews are responsible for all the wars in the world.' Is he the right director [for the film about Judah Maccabee]?" Eszterhas replied: "Adam Fogelson, Universal Pictures' chairman, said to [Gibson], 'Why do you want to do this story?' Mel said, 'Because I think I should.' I liked that answer very much." When asked about their shared Catholic faith, Eszterhas said of Gibson, "In my mind, his Catholicism is a figment of his imagination." 

By April 2012, Warner Bros. had canceled the Maccabee project; the film's last draft was dated February 20, 2012. Eszterhas claimed the break was caused by Gibson's violent outbursts and anti-Semitism, while Gibson blamed a bad script. Eszterhas later wrote a book, Heaven and Mel, about his experiences working with Gibson.

Other works
Eszterhas has written several best-selling books, including Hollywood Animal, an autobiography about politics in Hollywood, which superimposes his life as a young immigrant in the United States on his life as a powerful Hollywood player. His book The Devil's Guide to Hollywood was published in September 2006.

His book Crossbearer: A Memoir of Faith was published in 2008. It tells the story of his return to the Roman Catholic Church and his new-found devotion to God and family after surviving a throat cancer diagnosis in 2001. Eszterhas admitted smoking four packs of Salem Light cigarettes a day, as well as drinking heavily. He underwent surgery to remove 80% of his larynx, and had a trachea fitted.

Eszterhas wrote a book about his experiences with Mel Gibson and anti-Semitism, titled Heaven and Mel, wherein he portrays Gibson as a man fueled only by hatred, prone to violent outbursts. Among many damning statements is Eszterhas' claim that while staying at Gibson's Costa Rican estate to work on a script, he became so afraid that he slept with a golf club in his hand.

Personal life
In 1974, Eszterhas married Gerri Javor. They had two children together and divorced in 1994. That same year, Eszterhas married Naomi Bakar, and they had four children. 

In 1990, Eszterhas learned that his father was then being investigated by the U.S. Department of Justice for writing anti-Semitic propaganda in Hungary during the 1930s and early 1940s. He refused further contact with his father after this revelation, which he later claimed to have regretted, saying "When [my father] was in a Hungarian old-age home, the nurses kept calling and saying, 'He's dying, and he needs to see you.' Not going was a huge mistake. I’ve asked God to forgive me, but I don’t think I’ll be forgiven." 

Eszterhas is a Republican and is a supporter of Hungarian prime minister Viktor Orbán.

Filmography
 F.I.S.T. (1978) – received fee of $85,000 for the script but a record price of $400,000 for the novelization
 Flashdance (1983)
Blue Thunder (1983) – uncredited rewrite in five days; Eszterhas claims he came up with the ending
Pals (early 1980s)
 Jagged Edge (1985)
 Big Shots (1987) – sold for $1.25 million
 Hearts of Fire (1987)
 Betrayed (1988)
 Checking Out (1988)
 Music Box (1989)
 Basic Instinct (1992) – received $3 million
 Nowhere to Run (1993)
 Sliver (1993)
 Showgirls (1995) – sold for $2 million
 Jade (1995) – paid $1.5 million for a two-page outline plus $400,000 to executive produce
One Night Stand (1997) – paid a record $2.5 million for a four-page outline, with an additional $1.5 million to be paid once filming had started. Eszterhas' original script was changed so much he took his name off
 Telling Lies in America (1997)
 An Alan Smithee Film: Burn Hollywood Burn (1997)
 Children of Glory (2006)

Books
13 Seconds: Confrontation at Kent State, Dodd: Mead 1970, with Michael Roberts
 Charlie Simpson's Apocalypse, New York: Random House, 1973, .
Nark!, San Francisco: Straight Arrow Books, 1974
 American Rhapsody,  Vintage, 2001, 
 Hollywood Animal, Alfred A. Knopf, 2004, .
 The Devil's Guide to Hollywood, 2006, .
 Crossbearer: A Memoir of Faith, St. Martin's Press, 2008, .
 Heaven and Mel, Amazon Kindle Single, 2012,

References

External links
 
 "Joe Eszterhas: How did a B-movie screenwriter become an A-list celebrity?" (1998) in Slate
 "Man Behind 'Basic Instinct,' 'Showgirls' Reveals Faith in New Book" (1998) in The Christian Post
 

1944 births
20th-century American male writers
American male non-fiction writers
American male screenwriters
American newspaper journalists
American Roman Catholics
Hungarian emigrants to the United States
Journalists from Ohio
Living people
Ohio Republicans
Ohio University alumni
Rolling Stone people
Screenwriters from Ohio
Writers from Cleveland